In telecommunications, Entrance facility refers to the entrance to a building for both public and private network service cables (including antenna transmission lines, where applicable), including the entrance point at the building wall or floor, and continuing to the entrance room or entrance space.

Entrance facilities are the transmission facilities (typically wires or cables) that connect competitive LECs’ networks with incumbent LECs’ networks. 

Computer networking